Ali Abad Metro Station is a station in Tehran Metro Line 1. It is located in Shahid Dastvare Boulevard. It is between Javanmard-e-Ghassab Metro Station and Khazane Metro Station.

References 

Tehran Metro stations
Railway stations opened in 2001